The 1976–77 Maltese First Division was the 62nd season of top-tier football in Malta.  It was contested by 10 teams, and Floriana F.C. won the championship.

League standings

Relegation tie-breaker
With both Msida Saint-Joseph and Zebbug Rangers level on 13 points, a play-off match was conducted to Relegation

Results

References
Malta - List of final tables (RSSSF)

Maltese Premier League seasons
Malta
Premier